Douglas Frank Carter (April 22, 1944 - March 27, 2001) served in the California State Assembly during the 1970s. He was born in Canada.

References

1944 births
2001 deaths
Republican Party members of the California State Assembly